The .577/500 -inch Nitro Express is a British centerfire fire rifle cartridge.

Development
The .577/500 NE was developed by loading a -inch variant of the .577/500 Black Powder Express with smokeless cordite. The latter was developed by necking down the .577 Black Powder Express to .508".

Whilst very similar to the .577/500 No 2 Black Powder Express the two are not interchangeable.

Use
Despite being a similar size, the .577/500 NE is not nearly as powerful as the .500 Nitro Express and is not suitable for such thick-skinned game as elephant.  Like the .500 Black Powder Express, the .577/500 NE was never highly regarded for hunting in Africa, yet it was popular in India.

Moderately popular in its day, the round has long since ceased to be offered commercially.

See also
Nitro Express
List of rifle cartridges
12mm caliber

References

Footnotes

Bibliography
 Barnes, Frank C, Cartridges of the World, ed 13, Gun Digest Books, Iola, 2012, .
 Wieland, Terry, Nitro Express: The Big Bang of the Big Bang, retrieved 20 Jun 16.

External links
 cartridgecollector.net, 577/500 " Nitro Express, retrieved 20 Jun 16.

Pistol and rifle cartridges
British firearm cartridges